Rachel Wall (c. 1760 – October 8, 1789) was an American female pirate, and the last woman to be hanged in Massachusetts. She may also have been the first American-born woman to become a pirate.

Early life 
Wall was born Rachel Schmidt in Carlisle, in the Province of Pennsylvania, to a family of devout Presbyterians. She lived on a farm outside Carlisle, but was not happy, and spent most of her time at a waterfront. While at the waterfront, she was attacked by a group of girls, and rescued by a man named George Wall. They two later married.

Career as a pirate 
Wall and her husband moved to Boston, where he took a job on a fishing schooner. When George came back, he brought with him five sailors and their lovers, and persuaded Wall to join them. In one week, the party had spent all their money and the schooner set sail again, upon which George suggested they all become pirates. He borrowed another schooner from a friend, and the party set sail.

Wall and her crew worked in the Isle of Shoals, just off the New Hampshire coast. After storms Wall would stand on the deck and scream for help. When passers-by came to give aid, they were killed and all their goods stolen. The crew was successful in capturing 12 boats, stealing $6,000 cash, an indeterminate amount of valuables, and killing 24 sailors, all between 1781 and 1782.

Arrest and execution
Eventually, after her husband and the crew washed out to sea by accident, Wall returned to Boston and resumed her role as a servant. However, she still enjoyed going to the docks and sneaking into harbored boats, stealing things from inside. Her final robbery occurred when she saw a young woman named Margaret Bender, wearing a bonnet which she coveted. She attempted to steal the bonnet and rip Margaret's tongue out, but was caught and arrested. She was tried for robbery on September 10, 1789 but requested that she be tried as a pirate, while maintaining that she had never killed anyone. However, she was found guilty of robbery and sentenced to be hanged on October 8, 1789. She is said to have quoted "...into the hands of the Almighty God I commit my soul, relying on his mercy...and die an unworthy member of the Presbyterian Church, in the 29th year of my age", as her final words. Her death marked the last occasion a woman was hanged in Massachusetts.

References

Further reading
Life, last words and dying confession, of Rachel Wall: who, with William Smith and William Dunogan, were executed at Boston, on Thursday, October 8, 1789, for high-way robbery (Boston printed broadside)
Boston's Histories: Essays in Honor of Thomas H. O'Connor by Thomas H. O'Connor, James M. O'Toole, and David Quigley. 
The Power of the Press: The Birth of American Political Reporting by Thomas C. Leonard.

External links
Rachel Wall at ThePirateKing.com

1760 births
1789 deaths
American female pirates
People from Cumberland County, Pennsylvania
Year of birth uncertain
18th-century pirates
People executed for piracy
Executed American women